This article lists feature-length films and full-length documentaries that were at least partly produced by the Bangladeshi film industry and were released in Bangladesh in 2015. Short films and made-for-TV films are not included. Films are ordered by domestic public release date, excluding film festivals, theatrical releases abroad, and sneak previews or screenings.

Releases

January–March

April–June

July–September

October–December

See also

 2015 in Bangladesh

Notes

References

Bangladesh
Films
 2015